Caladenia nana, commonly known as pink fan orchid, is a plant in the orchid family Orchidaceae and is endemic to the south-west of Western Australia. It is a clump-forming ground orchid with a single linear leaf and up to 6 pale pink to rose pink flowers.

Description
Caladenia nana is a terrestrial, perennial, deciduous herb that forms clumps. The sepals and petals are broadly lance-shaped with glandular hairs on the back. Flowering occurs from August to November.

Taxonomy and naming
Caladenia nana was first formally described in 1846 by Stephan Endlicher in Lehmann's Plantae Preissianae from specimens collected on Mount Clarence in 1840. The specific epithet (nana) means "dwarf".

In 2001, Stephen Hopper and Andrew Phillip Brown described two subspecies of Caladenia nana in the journal Nuytsia and the names are accepted by the Australian Plant Census:

Distribution and habitat
Caladenia nana grows in winter-wet flats and swamps in jarrah forest in the Avon Wheatbelt, Esperance Plains, Jarrah Forest, Swan Coastal Plain and Warren bioregions of south-western Western Australia.

Conservation
Caladenia nana and both subspecies are classified as "not threatened" by the Western Australian Government Department of Parks and Wildlife.

References

nana
Plants described in 1846
Endemic orchids of Australia
Orchids of Western Australia
Taxa named by Stephan Endlicher